Town Hall Metro Station is a station of Kochi Metro, formerly known as Lissie Metro Station. It was opened on 3 October 2017 as a part of the extension of the metro system from Palarivattom to Maharaja's College. The station is located between Kaloor and M. G. Road. The former name of the station refers to the name of the nearby Lissie Hospital, which, in turns, is derived from Thérèse of Lisieux. The station was renamed on 1 February 2020.

References

Kochi Metro stations
Railway stations in India opened in 2017